Tweedy, Browne Company LLC is an American investment advisory and fund management firm founded in 1920 and headquartered in Stamford, CT. As of December 2012, it managed approximately 13 billion dollars in separate accounts and four mutual funds.

History
The company was started in 1920 by Forest Berwind "Bill" Tweedy, who initially focused on what are known as "thinly traded" shares of smaller companies, often family owned, that traded in lower numbers and lower volume than larger company stock. This niche allowed him to buy stocks at a significant discount due to the limited options for sellers. Tweedy's focus on buying shares at a discount caught the attention of Benjamin Graham, the father of value investing who was in the 1920s and '30s formalizing his theories. Tweedy and Graham eventually became friends and worked out of the same New York City office building.

After decades working solo, Tweedy was joined by Howard Browne and Joe Reilly in 1945. Walter Schloss had a close friendship with Tweedy and the pair shared investing theories and business referrals, but Schloss never officially works at Tweedy, Browne. Bill Tweedy retired in 1957, and Howard Browne became president of the company. 

Warren Buffett, a protege of Graham, was closely linked with Tweedy, Browne in the early stages of his investing career. He used Tweedy, Browne as his preferred brokerage for Buffet Partnership, Ltd. (1956-1966), and bought his first shares of Berkshire Hathaway through the firm.

By the 1960s, Tweedy, Browne had expanded from a brokerage and market maker to managing money for outside investors. Buffett singled out Tweedy, Browne as superior investors in his 1984 article "The Superinvestors of Graham-and-Doddsville," noting they outperformed both the Dow Jones Industrial Average and S&P 500 by substantial margins from 1966 to 1982. 

In 1997 Tweedy, Browne was purchased by the holding company Affiliated Managers Group for $300 million.

The firm's managing directors included well-known value investor Christopher H. Browne, Howard Browne's son and author of The Little Book of Value Investing (2007). Christoper Browne died on December 13, 2009. During Christopher Browne's tenure, two of the firm's mutual funds outperformed market averages between 1993 and 2009.

The managers of Tweedy, Browne also published a number of freely available papers about investment strategies.

Investing philosophy
All of the firm's funds are managed in accordance to the principles of Value Investing as popularized by Benjamin Graham. Tweedy became acquainted with Graham in the early 1930s.

In a 1992 paper, Tweedy, Browne outlined the five characteristics they use to select stocks. (1) Low price to book value; (2) low price to earnings ratio; (3) significant stock purchases by executive officers at a company, particularly when stock price drops, indicating insiders have confidence in long-term company prospects; (4) significant drop in stock price; (5) small market capitalization. While these traits do not guarantee a positive outcome, the firm cites academic research from around the world to indicate these traits may increase the odds of investing success when consistently applied over time.

References

External links 
Tweedy, Browne website

Investment management companies of the United States
Companies based in Stamford, Connecticut